Christopher Liam Metters (born 12 September 1990) is a former professional cricketer who made his first-class debut for Warwickshire County Cricket Club in 2011. He played Minor Counties cricket for Devon from 2008 to 2010. He was born at Torquay, Devon.

Metters missed the entire 2012 first-class season due to a shoulder injury. He underwent surgery in July.

After failing to recover from a persistent shoulder injury, Metters was released by Warwickshire towards the end of the 2013 season.

References

External links 

1990 births
Living people
Sportspeople from Torquay
Warwickshire cricketers
English cricketers
Devon cricketers